is a railway station in the city of Toyokawa, Aichi, Japan, operated by Meitetsu.

Lines
Odabuchi Station is served by the Meitetsu Nagoya Main Line and is 6.6 kilometers from the terminus of the line at Toyohashi Station.

Station layout
The station has two elevated opposed side platforms with the station building underneath. The platforms are short, and can only accommodate trains of four carriages in length. For six-carriage trains, the rear two doors remain closed through the use of a door cut system. The station has automated ticket machines, Manaca automated turnstiles and is unattended.

Platforms

Adjacent stations

Station history
Odabuchi Station was opened on January 12, 1934 as a station on the Aichi Electric Railway. On April 1, 1935, the Aichi Electric Railway merged with the Nagoya Railroad (the forerunner of present-day Meitetsu). The station has been unattended since 1967.

Passenger statistics
In fiscal 2017, the station was used by an average of 260 passengers daily.

Surrounding area
 Japan National Route 1

See also
 List of Railway Stations in Japan

References

External links

 Official web page 

Railway stations in Japan opened in 1934
Railway stations in Aichi Prefecture
Stations of Nagoya Railroad
Toyokawa, Aichi